Coccodinium is a genus of five species of fungi within the Coccodiniaceae family.

References

External links
Coccodinium at Index Fungorum

Lecanoromycetes genera
Taxa named by Abramo Bartolommeo Massalongo
Taxa described in 1860